Chak 98NB Sargodha is a village in Tehsil Sargodha, Pakistan. Its coordinates: Latitude 31.97962591 & Longitude 72.6436925. Direction to Qibla 259 degree from North; Distance to Qibla 3448 km. 
Its distance from Sargodha city is 13.3 km . Lahore located to 194 km ; Sialkot to Chak 98NB Sargodha 213 km ; Islamabad 262 km ; Peshawar 388 km ; Quetta 802 km and Karachi located 1215 km: it is situated on Sargodha to Shaheenabad road.

Constituency
NA-91 Sargodha-IV & PP-76 Sargodha-V.
Chak 88, Chak 99, Chak 100 and Chak 98 are the part of Union Council 73.

Education
In Chak 98NB Sargodha there is a primary school and a middle school for boys. There is no high school for boys. There is a primary school, high school and a degree college for girls in Chak 98NB Sargodha.

Religion
Muslims are the majority in this Chak.
There are also Christians and Ahmadiyya communities in minorities.

Health
There is no working hospital or first aid center.

Economy
Agriculture and Livestock are a major part of the economy.

Transport
There is bus service between Sargodha and Sillanwali and a train station at Charnali  near from Chak 98NB Sargodha. There is also a train station at Pindi Rasool, which is not operating.

Populated places in Sargodha District